École secondaire catholique Franco-Cité is a French Catholic school located in the Alta Vista neighbourhood of Ottawa, Ontario. It operates under the Conseil des écoles catholiques du Centre-Est (CECCE) school board and is renowned for its numerous sports programs including its flagship "Sport-Études" program.

History
The building previously held different names and has had a variety of uses throughout the years. Originally a separate school, many of the old dorms have been converted to classrooms, distinguishable by their long and narrow forms. The building was at one point used for a trade school before eventually being converted to a French high school opening in 1979 under the name Samuel-Genest.

Franco-Cité Catholic High School was inaugurated by the CECCE on October 20, 1994, thanks to the culmination of efforts and initiatives of several members of the community and of the CECCE. In its first year of operation, Franco-Cité Catholic High School welcomed 150 grade 9 students. As of the 2021 school year, that number has increased to over 1,500 students of grades ranging from 7–12.

The school has seen upgrades to its sporting facilities throughout the years. In 2011, construction was completed on a brand new two million dollar multi-purpose turf field. The project was a collaboration between The Ottawa Internationals Soccer Club, CECCE, OCDSB and both the provincial and federal government. The project also saw an almost identical field built next to Hillcrest High School across the street.

From the span of 2008 to 2013, the school saw massive rises in their registration numbers. In just five years, the school gained nearly 300 students. To accommodate this rapid growth, the school received seven million dollars of funding for an expansion project. This saw the construction of six new classrooms, a brand new full sized gymnasium along with new changerooms, a new weights room, a multipurpose studio and new offices for staff involved with the sports program. The new gymnasium was again a collaboration between the school board and The Ottawa Internationals Soccer Club. All new facilities were fully operational by the start of the 2014–2015 school year.

See also 
École secondaire catholique Franco-Cité (Nipissing) - Similarly named school in Sturgeon Falls.
List of high schools in Ontario

References

External links
 Franco-Cite Programmes Sports-études

High schools in Ottawa
French-language schools in Ottawa
French-language high schools in Ontario
Catholic secondary schools in Ontario
Educational institutions established in 1994
1994 establishments in Ontario
Middle schools in Ottawa